Events from the year 2013 in Antarctica

Events

January
An  meteorite was discovered frozen in ice on the Nansen ice field by a Search for Antarctic Meteorites, Belgian Approach (SAMBA) mission.

Date unknown
A study published in Nature Geoscience in this year identified central West Antarctica as one of the fastest-warming regions on Earth. The researchers present a complete temperature record from Antarctica's Byrd Station and assert that it "reveals a linear increase in annual temperature between 1958 and 2010 by 2.4±1.2 °C".

References

 
2010s in Antarctica
Years of the 21st century in Antarctica